|}

The Donohue Marquees Juvenile Hurdle is a Grade 2 National Hunt novice hurdle race in Ireland which is open to horses aged four years only. 
It is run at Fairyhouse over a distance of 2 miles (3,218 metres), and it is scheduled to take place each year at the course's Easter Festival.

The race was awarded Grade 3 status in 2008, later raised to Grade 2 in 2016. Prior to 2015 it was sponsored by Tayto, and in 2015 and 2016 it was sponsored by R E A Grimes Property Consultants. The sponsors of the 2017 and 2018 runnings were Avoca Handweavers and from 2019 to 2021 the race was sponsored by the Rathbarry and Glenview Studs. Since 2022 the sponsors are Donohue Marquees.

Records
Leading jockey since 1988 (4 wins):
 Paul Carberry –  Micks Delight (1994), Embellished I (1996), Dashing Home (2003), The Fist Of God (2009) 
 Ruby Walsh -  Balla Sola (1999), Artist's Muse (2006), Twinlight (2011), French Made (2019) 

Leading trainer since 1988  (8 wins):
 Noel Meade -  Rocket Dancer (1990), Visions Pride (1991), Glencloud (1992), Micks Delight (1994), Embellished I (1996), Dashing Home (2003), The Fist Of God (2009), Jeff Kidder (2021)

Winners since 1988

See also
 Horse racing in Ireland
 List of Irish National Hunt races

References
Racing Post:
 , 

National Hunt races in Ireland
National Hunt hurdle races
Fairyhouse Racecourse